The Wirtschaftsschule ( or Commercial School) is one of different types of public school in the German Federal State of Bavaria. Wirtschaftschule students are normally between 13 and 16 years of age and study a variety of traditional academic subjects, and receive training specifically geared towards a future career in business.

General information 

Pupils in the Wirtschaftsschule stay there for between two and four years. The Wirtschaftsschule is unique to the Bavarian educational system, and students become out of sync with the traditional system of education as a consequence of enrolling in this type of school. Students in the 'Gymnasium' and 'Realschule' track often are able to transfer to the Wirtschaftschule program.

Admission is granted when the student has successfully gained the necessary qualifications from the 'Hauptschule', or after an assessment of their suitability to enter. This generally takes the form of a three-day assessment specializing in German and Mathematics.

The Wirtschaftsschule programs end after the tenth year of schooling or for students of the two years program after the eleventh year.  Thus, the four-year program begins after the sixth year, the three-year program after the seventh year, and the two-year program after the eighth year.

Graduation 

Successful graduates of the school have the length of their training shortened by a year in many occupations.

Upon successful completion of the curriculum, students receive a "Mittlerer Schulabschluss", which is comparable to the British GCSE.

Choice of academic program 

At the eight academic year, students generally have a choice between focusing on business-related and on technical and mathematical subjects for the duration of their study.

Students can choose between the H pathway (100% economic focus) and the M pathway (mathematical and technical focus).

Academic courses in the H pathway

Academic courses in the H pathway are

1. Economics
 Business Studies (compulsory)
 National and International Economy (compulsory in year 10)
 Accounting & Financial Reporting (compulsory)
 Financial and Business Mathematics (compulsory in year 8)
 Mathematics (optionally after successful completion of year 8)

2. Languages
 German Language (compulsory)
 English Language (compulsory)
 Spanish Language (optionally)
 French Language (optionally)

3. Information Technology
 Data Processing (compulsory in year 8 and 9)
 Word Processing (compulsory)

4. General Education
 Religious Education or Philosophy & Ethics (one of both is compulsory)
 Physical Education (compulsory)
 Social Sciences (compulsory in year 9 and 10)
 History (compulsory)
 Arts (compulsory in year 7, 8 and 9)

5. Natural Sciences
 Geography (compulsory in year 7, 8 and 9)
 Biology (compulsory in year 7)

6. Other
 Project Work (compulsory in year 9 and 10)
 Practical Business Training (compulsory in year 9 and 10)

Academic courses in the M pathway

Academic courses in the M pathway are

1. Economics
 Business Studies (compulsory)
 National and International Economy (compulsory in year 10)
 Accounting & Financial Reporting (compulsory)
 Financial and Business Mathematics (compulsory in year 8)
 Mathematics (compulsory)

2. Natural Sciences
 Geography (compulsory in year 8)
 Biology (compulsory in year 7)
 Physics (compulsory)

3. Languages
 German Language (compulsory)
 English Language (compulsory)
 Spanish Language (optionally)
 French Language (optionally)

4. Information Technology
 Data Processing (compulsory in year 8 a 9)
 Word Processing (compulsory)

5. General Education
 Religious Education or Philosophy & Ethics (one of both is compulsory)
 Physical Education (compulsory)
 Social Sciences (compulsory in year 9 and 10)
 History (compulsory)
 Arts (compulsory in year 7, 8 and 9)

6. Other
 Project Work (compulsory in year 9 and 10)
 Practical Business Training (compulsory in year 9 and 10)

References

Education in Bavaria
School types